In shogi, Retreating Rook (引き飛車 hikihisha) is a variant of the Double Wing Attack (相掛かり aigakari) opening and joseki in which Black's rook retreats all the way back to their camp after a pawn exchange in the eighth file allowing White to also exchange rook pawns.

Development

The Retreating Rook option occurs after Black and White exchange pawns on the second file.

6. R-28. Black's rook retreats back to their camp on rank 8. (See: Double Wing Attack.)

Following this, White has the option immediately trading their rook pawn on the eighth file in order to get a pawn in hand.

Alternately, White may attempt to delay trading the rook pawn and instead develop other pieces first.

White's pawn trade

6. ...P-86, 7. Px86 Rx86. After Black's rook has retreated, White now has the option of exchanging their rook pawn in order to get a pawn in hand and clear their eighth file in order to activate their rook. This is played with a similar sequences of moves used for Black's earlier second file pawn exchange.

8. P*87. A pawn drop by Black.

After the pawn exchange and Black's pawn drop on move 15, White also has the option of either floating their rook just above their line of pawns to the rank 4 (§ White's Floating Rook) or retreating their rook awhile back to the rook's start position on rank 2 (§ White's Retreating Rook). White's Floating Rook is the more common variant.

White's Floating Rook

8. ...R-84. White floats their rook to rank 4. The Floating Rook position defends rank 4 from further encroachment by Black.

Climbing Silver

After White's Floating Rook (or also Retreating Rook), a common variant of Double Wing Attack Retreating Rook is for Black to play Climbing Silver.

9. S-38. Black moves their right silver up to advance up the second file. This can lead to the most direct way to play Climbing Silver which is called  Primitive Climbing Silver.

9. ...P-34. White moves their third file pawn to open their bishop's diagonal.

Reclining Silver

Other variants of Double Wing Attack Retreating Rook include Reclining Silver.

The Reclining Silver has the right silver positioned on central file above the central pawn and to the right of the silver is the pawn that was advancing in order to let the silver move through the line of pawns. The silver is said to recline on the seat of pawns.

White's Retreating Rook

The Retreating Rook option occurs after Black and White exchange pawns on the eighth file. This option results in a Double Retreating Rook variation of Double Wing Attack.

8. ...R-82. White's rook retreats back their camp on rank 2.

This option is less common than White playing a Floating Rook position. (See above.) It gives White less protection from an attack strategy by Black such as Climbing Silver. However, it does lead to the Stagecoach joseki. (See below.)

Note that if White retreats their rook to 8b, then, compared to the Double Wing position before Black's pawn exchange, the following moves have effectively only removed each player's rook pawn and placed them in hand.

Stagecoach

The Stagecoach joseki (駅馬車定跡 ekibasha jouseki) is a symmetrical Double Retreating Rook and Double Reclining Silver variant of Double Wing Attack.

It was named after the American movie Stagecoach.

Delaying the pawn trade

White need not trade the eighth file pawns immediately after Black's second file trade. For instance, White may choose to wait and instead advance their right edge pawn.

9. ...P-94. White pushes their ninth file pawn.

10. P-96. Black usually pushes their same edge pawn in response.

If Black does not respond with their own edge pawn push, then White is threatening to push their edge pawn further to the middle rank 5 (10. ...P-95), which will prevent Black from pushing their edge pawn at all and leaving Black's bishop without a square to escape to from White's pawn drop (P*87). This puts pressure on Black in the sense that Black must carefully prepare any further pawn advancement when their bishop has no path of escape since White may attempt to capture that pawn after the eighth file pawn trade.

10. ...P-34. White activates their bishop by opening its diagonal.

Other moves are possible such as making the rook pawn trade now (with 10. ...P-86) or advancing their attacking silver (10. ...S-72).

11. S-38. Black advances their right silver up the third file allowing for both Climbing Silver or Reclining Silver options.

11. ...S-72. White also develops their right silver in the same way.

See also

 Double Wing Attack
 Double Wing Floating Rook
 Static Rook

Notes

References

Bibliography

External links
 How to Defend in Shogi: Basic Formation 1: Bogin
 Shogi Shack: Aigakari Primitive Climbing Silver
 Yamajunn's Basic Shogi Opening: 
 Aigakari
 Genshi Bougin
 Anti-Genshi Bougin
 Shogi Maze:  Bogin Strategy In Aigakari
 Shogi Opening: Double Wing Attack Climbing Silver
 Shogi in English: Double Wing Attack Climbing Silver

Shogi openings
Double Wing Attack openings